Intrepid was a ship launched at Whitby in 1829. She traded with Quebec in 1830, later carrying migrants to Canada. She was lost at Colombo in 1834.

Career
Intrepid first appeared in Lloyd's Register (LR) in 1830. 
In 1830 Intrepid was registered in Hull. 

At the time a number of ships were sailing from Whitby with immigrants to Canada. Crown sailed in 1828; Intrepid, Addison, Gulnare, Earl Stanhope, and Jackson sailed in 1830. However, on Intrepids first voyage to Canada she sailed in ballast, i.e., without cargo or passengers. She sailed from  Whitby on 12 June 1830 and arrived at Quebec City on 8 August. She cleared outward bound on 14 September.

On 21 January 1831 Thomas Robinson pleaded guilty to the charge of having a fire aboard his vessel. He was fined £3.

In 1831 Intrepid sailed to Archangel. She returned with a cargo of wheat, oats, and mats. She also brought lumber, masts, spars, and oars, and ten tongues.  

Intrepid sailed from Hull on 25 March 1832 with passengers, possibly including labourers. She arrived at Quebec City on 5 May. She had not stopped, as she was supposed to, at the quarantine station at Grosse Isle. She was therefore ordered back to the quarantine ground as an example, to prevent others violating the law in the same manner. She arrived back in Hull around 21 July with timber and wheat.

Intrepid again sailed from Hull on 16 August 1832. She arrived at Quebec City on 4 October with 19 settlers.

In 1833 Intrepid sailed for India, sailing via Rio de Janeiro. On 11 October she was at Bengal (Calcutta).  While Intrepid was in Calcutta, Robinson's eldest son, the 15-year old Thomas, Jr., died there.

On 20 June 1834 Intrepid sailed from Gravesend, bound for Ceylon.

Fate
A gale drove Intrepid ashore on 29 November 1834 at Colombo, wrecking her. Her crew were rescued. She was outward bound for London.

Citations and references
Citations

References
 
 

1829 ships
Ships built in Whitby
Age of Sail merchant ships of England
Migrant ships to Canada
Maritime incidents in November 1834